Kent Franklin McWhirter (born September 26, 1942), known by his stage name Kent McCord, is a retired American actor, best known for his role as Officer Jim Reed on the television series Adam-12.

Life and career
McCord was born Kent Franklin McWhirter in Los Angeles, California to Bert and Laura McWhirter. First using his real name on television in 1962 in The Adventures of Ozzie & Harriet, he later adopted his stage name. He became a close friend of Rick Nelson and made 44 appearances on the program. He also landed small parts in five Elvis Presley films and (as Kent McWhirter) portrayed a motorcycle courier in McHale's Navy in the episode "Monkey Business 007".  McCord also appeared in the first episode (September 14, 1967) of Raymond Burr's Ironside series, titled "Message from Beyond", as motorcycle cop Kellogg.

In the first season of Jack Webb's Dragnet 1967, he appeared three times. The first appearance was an extra as a patrol officer in the episode "The Big Explosion". He was credited under his legal name. In the third episode, "The Interrogation", McCord was credited under his stage name in the role of a police officer who has been accused of robbing a store while working an undercover narcotics detail fresh out of the police academy. McCord went on to appear five additional times in the second season, three times as unnamed officers and twice as his eventual Adam-12 character Jim Reed. He appeared once more on Dragnet as Reed before the character became exclusive to Adam-12.

McCord's big break came in 1968 when he was given a lead role next to Martin Milner as rookie police officer James A. "Jim" Reed on Adam-12, a police drama television series created by Jack Webb. The show ran on NBC from 1968 to 1975.

McCord was elected to the national board of directors of the Screen Actors Guild in 1972 and was on the board for 11 years. He was the first national vice president while on the National Board of Directors.

McCord appeared as a downed fighter ace on the 1970s series Baa Baa Black Sheep. In 1980, he played Troy on the television series Galactica 1980. Two years later, Webb tabbed him for a new Dragnet series he was ready to launch, with McCord to play the partner to Webb's Joe Friday. Webb died in December 1982, however, before any of the episodes he wrote could be produced. In 1982, McCord played Mr. Unger on Airplane II: The Sequel.

In 1989, he co-starred on the crime drama Unsub. He re-teamed with Martin Milner, his co-star in Adam-12, in the cable TV-movie Nashville Beat (1990), originally shown on The Nashville Network. In 1990, McCord appeared in the film Predator 2 as Captain Pilgrim. He played John Reynolds in Return of the Living Dead 3 (1993). 

From 1994 to 1995, McCord played the recurring role of Scott Keller on seaQuest DSV. He appeared in three episodes of JAG, and more recently, became a semi-regular guest star on Farscape, where he played two versions (one human and one alien appearing in the physical form of the human) of the same character, Jack Crichton from 1999 to 2003, appearing in all four seasons. He played Deputy U.S. Marshal Jack Hendricks on the series Renegade.

Filmography

Television

References

External links
 

1942 births
American male film actors
American male television actors
Living people
Male actors from Los Angeles
20th-century American male actors
21st-century American male actors